Bayan (Mandarin: 巴燕镇) is a town in Hualong Hui Autonomous County, Haidong, Qinghai, China. In 2010, Bayan had a total population of 38,315: 19,390 males and 18,925 females: 9,334 aged under 14, 26,934 aged between 15 and 65 and 2,047 aged over 65.

References 

Township-level divisions of Qinghai
Haidong